Dan, Daniel or Danny Devine may refer to:

 Dan Devine (1924–2002), American Hall-of-Fame college football and National Football League head coach
 Danny Devine (footballer, born 1992), Irish professional footballer for Inverness Caledonian Thistle
 Danny Devine (footballer, born 1997), English professional footballer for Chester